Joseph MacDonald (born July 1824) was a political figure in Nova Scotia, Canada. He represented Antigonish County in the Nova Scotia House of Assembly from 1867 to 1874 as a Liberal member.

He was born in Antigonish, Nova Scotia and educated there. In 1867, he married Emily McDonald. MacDonald was defeated when he ran for reelection in 1874.

References 
The Canadian parliamentary companion, HJ Morgan (1874)

1824 births
Year of death missing
Nova Scotia Liberal Party MLAs